The 2012 Major League Soccer All-Star Game, held on July 25, 2012, was the 17th annual Major League Soccer All-Star Game, a soccer match involving all-stars from Major League Soccer. The game was played at PPL Park, now known as Subaru Park, in Chester, Pennsylvania, the first time an all-star event was played in the Philadelphia area since the 2002 NBA All-Star Game.

The game featured the MLS All-Stars against Premier League team Chelsea, who were the FA Cup and European Champions League holders. Chelsea made their 2nd appearance in the MLS All-Star Game; the Blues were visiting side in the 2006 MLS All-Star Game at Toyota Park in Bridgeview, Illinois, losing to the MLS XI 1–0.

Piotr Nowak, the coach of the Philadelphia Union (the All-Star Game's host), was originally announced to coach the MLS All-Stars. After Nowak was dismissed from the Union on June 13, MLS chose D.C. United coach and Pennsylvania native Ben Olsen to coach the All-Stars.

A tracking system was worn by each player to monitor heart rate, intensity of play, speed, distance covered and other personal characteristics in real-time.

Rosters

MLS All-Stars

 ♦

 (Captain)

 ♦

 **

 %

 ♥ 
 ♥ 
 ♥ 
 ♥ 
 ♥ 
 ♥ 
 ♥ 
 ♥ 
 ♥ 
 ♥ 
 ♥ 
 ♥ 
 ♥

♦ - Players selected by MLS Commissioner Don Garber
* - Injured and unavailable for matchday
** - Added as a replacement for Heath Pearce
% - Promoted from the Inactive Roster to the Active Roster to fulfill Chelsea's request that the number of substitutes be increased from seven to ten.
♥ - "Inactive Roster" players voted for by other players in MLS

Chelsea

Match

Details

References

2012
Chelsea F.C. matches
Soccer in Pennsylvania
All-Star Game
MLS All-Star
July 2012 sports events in the United States
Sports competitions in Pennsylvania
Chester, Pennsylvania